Daffy Duck's Quackbusters is a 1988 animated compilation film featuring classic Warner Bros. Cartoons shorts and animated bridging sequences, starring Daffy Duck. The film was released to theaters by Warner Bros. on September 24, 1988. It was the final theatrical production in which Mel Blanc provided the voices of the various Looney Tunes characters before his death on July 10, 1989.

Unlike previous compilation films, Quackbusters uses pre-existing music from older Looney Tunes shorts composed by Carl Stalling, Milt Franklyn and William Lava for both the new animation and classic footage. It was also one of the two compilation films of classic Warner Bros. cartoon shorts not composed by Robert J. Walsh (the other being 1979's The Bugs Bunny/Road Runner Movie, which was composed by Dean Elliott). 

Similar to The Looney Looney Looney Bugs Bunny Movie, which was preceded with the Oscar-winning Knighty Knight Bugs (1958), Quackbusters is preceded with the exclusive short The Night of the Living Duck (1988). This film is inspired by Ghostbusters. It was the only Looney Tunes compilation film to be aired on HBO in the early 1990s. It later aired on Cartoon Network.

Plot 
The movie begins with a showing of the short The Night of the Living Duck before going into the opening credits. The story of the film serves as a continuation/re-working of Daffy Dilly.

Street corner salesman Daffy tries to make a pitch to reclusive millionaire and "ailing buzzsaw baron" J.P. Cubish (a dog) - who has offered wealth to anyone who can make him laugh before he passes on - only to be stymied by Cubish's butler (also a dog). Eventually driving off the butler, Daffy becomes Cubish's jester, taking uncounted pies in the face while Cubish laughs uproariously. After Cubish's death soon afterward ("died laughing", reports one newspaper), Daffy inherits the Cubish fortune, which is locked in a safe, under the provision that he will use the money to provide a beneficial public service and follow Cubish's creed to display honesty in business affairs. The now-wealthy Daffy derides the idea ("What a rube!" he says of Cubish), but his deceased benefactor returns as an unseen ghost, with the intention of reclaiming his fortune from Daffy, unless Daffy agrees to provide a service to the community as the terms of Cubish's will stated. The irked Daffy vows to use the money to wipe out ghosts (à la Ghostbusters) such as Cubish.

Setting himself up as a "Paranormalist at Large", Daffy persuades Bugs Bunny to appear in commercials (despite the rabbit's insistence of going to Palm Springs for his vacation), then hires Porky Pig (accompanied by Sylvester) as an underling; Cubish continues to make money vanish from inside the safe whenever Daffy seems to do or say something dishonest. Sylvester has an exploit with Tweety, where Sylvester is relentlessly chased by a monstrous version of Tweety and develops paranoia in front of Daffy and Porky. Daffy assigns Porky to investigate the resort town of Dry Gulch for any suspicious ghost activity. Porky agrees to take the case and takes the now-paranoid Sylvester with him, who has to defend his owner from killer mice in the town's hotel.

Meanwhile, Daffy successfully exorcises the ghosts possessing a beautiful light blonde-hair lady duck in a red night dress (with Daffy momentarily falling under possession from them himself), but upon returning to his office, he discovers that Cubish has stripped his money down to his last million. He then receives a call from Porky, who is returning with Sylvester from their assignment to Dry Gulch, and Daffy reassigns him to the Superstition Mountains, much to Sylvester's chagrin. After receiving a call from Transylvania, Daffy then calls up Bugs and assigns him to investigate. Bugs encounters Count Blood Count, whom the rabbit defeats in a duel of magic words, but Daffy is displeased to hear from him about "getting two couples together". After receiving a call from the Himalayas, Daffy phones up Bugs again, who is leaving following his encounter with Count Blood Count, and together they go up against Hugo the Abominable Snowman, with Hugo repeatedly mistaking Daffy for a rabbit.

When the city is swept with reports of a tiny elephant, Daffy, presuming this "teensy-elephant thing" to be mere hysteria, hopes to profit by soothing the public with his "expert" testimony. However, no sooner does he announce to the audience that there is no such thing as a tiny elephant when it turns up on Daffy's television interview, rendering him a public laughing stock. Daffy decides to blame the debacle on the absent Porky and absent-mindedly remarks that there was "nothing wrong with a little dishonesty in business affairs." This proves to be Daffy's undoing however, as upon realization of what he said, Daffy discovers that the safe is now completely empty except for a few cobwebs and a sign from Cubish: "YOU LOSE, DUCK!" Things get worse for a defeated Daffy when Egghead appears with a singing telegram, announcing to Daffy that due to unpaid rent, he is being dispossessed. After the repo crew takes away his desks, the building is condemned and destroyed, with Daffy still inside. Before impact, Daffy sadly tells the audience, "One thing's for sure, I've got nowhere else to go but up!"

In the epilogue, Bugs is shown enjoying his vacation in Palm Springs (after the encounter with Hugo) and reading about Daffy's downfall ("Quackbusted", reports the newspaper Bugs is reading), and Porky and Sylvester are stranded in the Superstition Mountains, with Sylvester as cowardly as ever. After a shot of Cubish's grave is shown where it states that Cubish is still dead, it is revealed that Daffy is back where he started, as a street corner salesman, this time selling paranormal-themed trinkets (including wind-up dolls of Gossamer). However, when Daffy earns a dollar bill, it instantly vanishes. The film ends with Daffy angrily shaking his fist at the sky and screaming "Cubish!", implying that Cubish is still haunting Daffy.

Voice Cast 
 Mel Blanc - Daffy Duck, Bugs Bunny, Porky Pig, Sylvester (archive), Tweety (archive), Hugo the Abominable Snowman (archive), J.P. Cubish, J.P. Cubish's Butler (archive), Mr. Hyde, Birdbath Owner (archive), Asylum Collector (archive), Coyote, Drunk (archive)
 Mel Tormé - Daffy Duck (singing voice)
 Ben Frommer - Count Bloodcount (archive)
 B.J. Ward - Melissa Duck/The Possessed Lady Duck
 Roy Firestone - Announcer
 Julie Bennet - Two-Headed Vulture (archive)
 Mark Kausler - Egghead (uncredited)

Film segments in order 
Several cartoons are re-edited either for time, to connect with the plot, or have redubbed lines.
 The Night of the Living Duck (opening sequence of Daffy reading comic books and dreaming)
 Daffy Dilly (1948) (used at beginning when Daffy tries to get to Cubish; with the report on Cubish now shown on TV; this short is used as one of the central elements in the film)
 The Prize Pest (1951) (used when Daffy recruits Porky; shortened starting from when Daffy warns Porky of his "split personality", cutting to before Porky hides in a closet and ending after Porky accidentally scares himself)
 Water, Water Every Hare (1952) (used progressively for the Paranormalists at Large commercials)
 Hyde and Go Tweet (1960) (Sylvester encounters Tweety, who changes into a monster without him realizing it, which leads to his paranoia; edited with new animation showing that Sylvester had gone into Daffy's office)
 Claws for Alarm (1954) (Porky and Sylvester's Dry Gulch assignment, with Porky's lines up to when they arrive at the hotel redubbed)
 The Duxorcist (1987) (Daffy's first assignment, where he ends up getting temporarily possessed)
 Transylvania 6-5000 (1963) (Bugs' Transylvania assignment; most of Bugs' lines are redubbed to reflect the film's plot and the ending where Bugs' ears turn into bat wings and Bugs flies away was cut)
 The Abominable Snow Rabbit (1961) (Bugs and Daffy's Himalayas assignment; the opening is altered to reflect the plot)
 Punch Trunk (1953) (a miniature elephant wanders through town, having many encounters with various people; the cartoon was heavily shortened with the bird bath scene edited to reflect the plot. In the credits, the title was mistakenly read as "Punch Truck".)
 Jumpin' Jupiter (1955) (seen in epilogue, identified as the Superstition Mountains)

Home media 
The film was released on DVD in the United States on August 4, 2009, by Warner Home Video. Three bonus cartoons are included as extras: Duck Dodgers and the Return of the 24½th Century, Superior Duck and Little Go Beep. It was later released in the UK on July 5, 2021, with the same bonus shorts. It is also available on iTunes.

The Duxorcist saw an individual release as part of the Looney Tunes Parodies Collection on February 4, 2020.

See also 
 List of animated feature films
 List of package films

References

Notes

External links 

 
 

1988 films
1988 animated films
1988 horror films
1980s American animated films
1980s comedy horror films
1980s fantasy comedy films
American animated horror films
American children's animated fantasy films
American ghost films
American monster movies
Warner Bros. animated films
1980s English-language films
Dr. Jekyll and Mr. Hyde films
Fictional paranormal investigators
Films about businesspeople
Films about exorcism
Films about inheritances
Animated films about mice
Bugs Bunny films
Daffy Duck films
Porky Pig films
Sylvester the Cat films
Tweety films
Films set in abandoned houses
Films set in hotels
Looney Tunes films
Vampires in animated film
Warner Bros. Animation animated films
Films about Yeti
Films scored by Carl Stalling
Films scored by Milt Franklyn
Films scored by William Lava
1980s children's animated films
1988 comedy films
Animated anthology films
Films with screenplays by Michael Maltese